Torridge Hospital was a health facility in Meddon Street, Bideford, Devon, England. It has been converted into apartments and remains a Grade II listed building.

History
The facility, which was designed by Sir George Gilbert Scott and William Bonython Moffatt, opened as the Bideford Union Workhouse in 1838. An isolation block was added in the 1880s and a new infirmary was completed in 1903. It became the Whitehouse Public Assistance Institution in 1930 and joined the National Health Service in 1948 before evolving into a geriatric facility. After the hospital closed in around 1993 the main building was converted into apartments as Westcroft Court.

References

Hospitals in Devon
Hospitals established in 1838
1838 establishments in England
Hospital buildings completed in 1838
Defunct hospitals in England
Bideford